SpVgg Au/Iller is a German football club from the district of Au in the northwest quarter of Illertissen, Bavaria. The team was founded 27 October 1928 as Sportvereinigung Au when Au was still a separate village on the banks of the river Iller.



History
Long an unremarked local side, in 1995 Au won its way out of sixth-tier play into the Verbandsliga Württemberg (V), where they finished as vice-champions in 1997 before winning the division title in 1999. That advanced them to the Oberliga Baden-Württemberg (IV) for a five-year turn running from 1999 to 2004. They also have a 1980 DFB-Pokal (German Cup) appearance and a losing appearance in the 1997 Württemberg-Pokal (Württemberg Cup) final to their credit.

Despite being a Bavarian club, SpVgg plays in the competition of neighbouring Württemberg because the town is closer to others there than in its home state. Their promotion to the Oberliga Baden-Württemberg in 1999 made them the first Bavarian club to ever play in Baden-Württemberg's top league.

Due to the expansion of the number of clubs in the leagues above, a second-place finish in the Verbandsliga in 2007–08 qualified the club to directly return to the Oberliga for the next season, alongside local rival FV Illertissen. Au was relegated from the league again in 2008–09 and experienced a disastrous 2009–10 campaign in the Verbandsliga, finishing last with only one point to their name, suffering point deductions and conceding 112 goals in 30 games. After no improvement at the level below in 2010–11, the club withdrew its team altogether from the league, thereby suffering another relegation and a restart in the Kreisliga A 3.

In addition to fielding a football team the sports club has departments for basketball, gymnastics, table tennis and tennis.

Honours
The club's honours:

League
 Verbandsliga Württemberg (V)
 Champions: 1999
 Landesliga Württemberg 2 (V-VI)
 Champions: 1989, 1993, 1995

Recent seasons
The recent season-by-season performance of the club:

With the introduction of the Regionalligas in 1994 and the 3. Liga in 2008 as the new third tier, below the 2. Bundesliga, all leagues below dropped one tier.

Stadium
Since 1978 SpVgg Au/Iller have played their home matches in the Heinrich-Oßwald-Stadion, which has a capacity of 1,000.

DFB Cup appearances
The club has qualified for the first round of the German Cup only once:

References

Sources
Grüne, Hardy (2001). Vereinslexikon. Kassel: AGON Sportverlag

External links
 Official team site  
 SpVgg Au profile on Weltfussball.de  
 Das deutsche Fußball-Archiv  historical German domestic league tables

Association football clubs established in 1928
Football clubs in Germany
Football clubs in Bavaria
Football clubs in Baden-Württemberg
Football in Swabia (Bavaria)
1928 establishments in Germany